A tetralogy is a set of four dramatic or literary works.

Tetralogy may also refer to:
Ingo tetralogy, a series of children's novels by author Helen Dunmore.
Ware Tetralogy, a series of science fiction novels by author Rudy Rucker
Tetralogy (album), an album by trombonist Paul Rutherford
Tetralogy of Fallot, a congenital heart defect